The Canadas is the collective name for the provinces of Lower Canada and Upper Canada, two historical British colonies in present-day Canada. The two colonies were formed in 1791, when the British Parliament passed the Constitutional Act, splitting the colonial Province of Quebec into two separate colonies. The Ottawa River formed the border between Lower and Upper Canada.

The Canadas were merged into a single entity in 1841, shortly after Lord Durham published his Report on the Affairs of British North America. His report held several recommendations, most notably union of the Canadas. Acting on his recommendation, the British Parliament passed the Act of Union 1840. The Act went into effect in 1841, uniting the Canadas into the Province of Canada. 

The terms "Lower" and "Upper" refer to the colony's position relative to the headwaters of the St. Lawrence River.
 Lower Canada covered the southeastern portion of the present-day province of Quebec, Canada, and (until 1809) the Labrador region of Newfoundland and Labrador.
 Upper Canada covered what is now the southern portion of the province of Ontario and the lands bordering Georgian Bay and Lake Superior.

History

The two colonies were created in 1791 with the passage of the Constitutional Act 1791. As a result of the influx of Loyalists from the American Revolutionary War, the Province of Quebec was divided into two new colonies, consisting of Lower and Upper Canada. The creation of Upper Canada was in response to the influx of United Empire Loyalist settlers, who desired a colonial administration modelled under British institutions and common law, especially British laws of land tenure. Conversely, Lower Canada maintained most of the French Canadian institutions guaranteed under the Quebec Act, such as the French civil law system.

In 1838 Lord Durham was sent to the colonies to examine the causes for rebellion in the Canadas. His report on the colonies recommended that the two colonies should be united, and the introduction of responsible government. The British Parliament would eventually act on the former suggestion, with the passage of the Act of Union 1840. The Act of Union went into force in 1841, and saw the Canadas united into the Province of Canada. However, the Act did not establish responsible government, which was not introduced until 1848.

See also
The Californias
The Carolinas
The Dakotas
The Floridas
Rhodesia (region)
The Virginias

References

External links

Former British colonies and protectorates in the Americas
States and territories established in 1791
1841 disestablishments in North America
History of Ontario by location
History of Quebec by location
Pre-Confederation Quebec
Former colonies in North America
1791 establishments in the British Empire
States and territories disestablished in 1841